The Site of the Red Square was a favourite political meeting place for protest movements around the 1940s and 50s. The Site is now covered by the South Mall and Car Park 4 of the Oriental Plaza. The defiance campaign was launched here in 1952, this was the first mass anti-apartheid campaign led by Nelson Mandela as volunteer-in chief of the African National Congress.Completed in 1976, the Plaza was built to accommodate Indian traders evicted by the apartheid government from the main trading street, 14th Street as well as other streets including the eastern and western boundary street, Delarey and Krause streets of Pageview, Fietas.

History

Red Square or Freedom Square was an open community square in Fordsburg.  During the 1940s and 1950s it was a political meeting place particularly popular with the Communist Party and the site for numerous defiance campaigns and gatherings.

In 1952, leaders of the African National Congress sent an ultimatum to the apartheid government to repeal all unjust laws.  The Defiance Campaign was launched when the government failed to comply.

On 6 April 1952, the 300 year anniversary after Jan van Riebeeck and the first European settlers arrived at the Cape, thousands marched to and gathered at Red Square from various locations and outlying towns.  The Defiance Campaign was launched at the square by James Moroka, president of the ANC and Yusuf Dadoo, head of the South African Indian Congress, together with many other African, Indian and Coloured leaders.  They protested against the unjust and oppressive laws and called for volunteers to defy them.  This culminated in groups of defiers who protested non-violently and offered themselves for arrest.

Volunteers included Nelson Mandela, Yusuf Dadoo, Walter Sisulu, Ahmed Kathrada and many more who all defied apartheid laws in Johannesburg and other main city centres.  Mandela, working with Maulvi Cachalia also actively worked to mobilise volunteers for the campaign.  This marked the beginning of non-racial co-operation in the resistance against apartheid and led to the drafting and adoption of the Freedom Charter in 1955.

Forced removals were enforced in the nearby suburb of Pageview (Fietas), destroying the existing vibrant commercial 14th Street and other streets.  The Oriental Plaza was built as a compromise between the Johannesburg City Council and the Department of Community Development in the 1970s, in an attempt to reluctantly address the loss of the evicted Indian traders.  In the process a substantial part of Fordsburg’s urban fabric including the Red Square was demolished.  The Red Square still however holds social, cultural and historical significance.

References

Squares in South Africa
Anti-Apartheid organisations
Geography of Johannesburg
National squares
Car-free zones in Africa